Sahitya Akademi Award to Marathi writers by Sahitya Akademi. No Award was conferred in 1957.

Recipients  
Following is the list of recipients of Sahitya Akademi Awards for their works written in Marathi.

References

External links
Sahitya Akademi India - Official Website

Sahitya Akademi Award
Sahitya Akademi Award
Sahitya Akademi Award
 
Marathi